Phytosphingosine is a sphingoid base, a fundamental building block of more complex sphingolipids. It is abundant in plants and fungi and present in animals.

References

Lipids
Amines
Triols